The Alpine A110 is a  sports car produced by French automobile manufacturer Alpine from 1963 to 1977. The car was styled as a "berlinette", which in the post-WWII era refers to a small enclosed two-door berline, better-known as a coupé. The Alpine A110 succeeded the earlier A108. The car was powered by a succession of Renault engines. A car also named Alpine A110 was introduced in 2017.

History
Launched in 1963, the A110, like previous road-going Alpines, used many Renault parts, including engines. While its predecessor the A108 was designed around Dauphine components, the A110 was updated to use R8 parts. Unlike the A108, which was available first as a cabriolet and only later as a coupé, the A110 was available first as a berlinette and then as a cabriolet. The most obvious external departure from the A108 coupé was a restyling of the rear bodywork. Done to accommodate the A110's larger engine, this change gave the car a more aggressive look. Like the A108, the A110 featured a steel backbone chassis and a fiberglass body. The A110 was originally offered with 1.1 L R8 Major or R8 Gordini engines. The Gordini engine has a power output of  SAE at 6,500 rpm.

The A110 achieved most of its fame in the early 1970s as a successful rally car. After winning several rallies in France in the late 1960s with the cast-iron R8 Gordini Cléon-Fonte engines the car was fitted with the aluminium-block Cléon-Alu from the Renault 16 TS. With two twin-venturi Weber 45 carburetors, the TS engine has a power output of  DIN at 6,000 rpm. The long-wheelbase Alpine A108 2+2 coupé was replaced with a new restyled 2+2 coupé based on the A110 mechanicals called the A110 GT4.

The car achieved international fame during the 1970–1972 seasons competing in the newly created International Championship for Manufacturers, winning events throughout Europe, and earning a reputation as one of the strongest rally cars of its time. Notable performances included a victory in the 1971 Monte Carlo Rally with Swedish driver Ove Andersson.

After Alpine's acquisition by Renault in 1971, the International Championship was replaced by the World Rally Championship for 1973, at which time Renault elected to compete with the A110. With a team featuring Bernard Darniche, Jean-Pierre Nicolas and Jean-Luc Thérier as permanent drivers and "guest stars" like Jean-Claude Andruet (who won the 1973 Monte Carlo Rally) the A110 won most of the races where the works team was entered, making Alpine the first World Rally Champion. Later competition-spec A110s received engines of up to 1.8 litres.

In addition to Alpine's own Dieppe factory, versions of the A110 were built under license by various other vehicle manufacturers around the world. From 1965 to 1974 the car was produced in Mexico under the name "Dinalpin" by Diesel Nacional (DINA), which also produced Renault vehicles. From 1967 to 1969, the A110 was also produced in Bulgaria under the name "Bulgaralpine" by a partnership formed between SPC Metalhim and ETO Bulet, whose collaboration also resulted in the production of the Bulgarrenault.

In Spain, the Alpine A110 was produced by FASA in Valladolid from 1967 to 1978. These were the only versions built outside France that were commercialised under the same names and to the same specifications as the French-built ones. FASA manufactured version A110 1100 (from 1967 to 1970) with 1108 cc engines, version A110 1300 (from 1971 to 1976) with 1289 cc engines, and version A110 1400 (from 1977 to 1978) with 1397 cc engines.

In 1974, the mid-engine Lancia Stratos which was the first car designed specifically for rally racing, was operational and homologated. At the same time it was obvious that the rear-engine A110 was nearing the limits of its development potential. The adoption of fuel injection brought no performance increase. On some cars, a DOHC 16-valve head was fitted to the engine, but it proved unreliable. Chassis modifications, such as the usage of the A310's double wishbone rear suspension, homologated with the A110 1600SC, also failed to increase performance. On the international stage the Stratos proved to be the "ultimate weapon", soon making the A110, as well as many other rally cars, obsolete. The A110 remains a staple of vintage racing events such as the Rallye Monte-Carlo Historique.

In 2012, to mark the 50th anniversary of the A110, Renault produced a concept car called the A110-50. The modern production version of the A110 was introduced by Renault in 2017.

Model changes

 October 1962: Prototype unveiled at Paris Show.
 June 1963: Production A110 launched with Renault 8-derived 956cc, 51 bhp engine, R8 four-speed gearbox and all-round disc brakes.
 October 1963: 1108cc,66bhp engine from R8 Major offered in V70 model, with new all-synchro four-speed gearbox.
 October 1964: 1108cc, 85bhp twin-carb R8 Gordini engine in 85 model. Five-speed ‘box optional. Competition 1100 also launched with high-compression, 1108cc,95bhp motor.
 June 1965: 1300 announced with 1296cc, 115bhp R8 Gordini motor: nearly all five-speed.
 October 1965: 956cc and 85 models deleted; 1108cc single-carb version renamed Standard. Chromed vents appear below headlights.
 June 1966: Production begins at FASA-Renault in Spain (cars have drum rear brakes).
 October 1966: Previous 1300 renamed Super, with extra 5bhp (to 120bhp) and five-speed. New 1300 has 1255cc, 105bhp R8 Gordini motor, and 1500 launched with 1470cc, 90bhp all-alloy motor from Renault 16. Twin Cibié driving lamps added to all models, and Renault badge appears on nose for first time.
 September 1968: 1500 superseded by 1600, with 92bhp R16TS 1565cc engine. 100 model deleted, along with Cabriolet and GT4 coupé.
 October 1969: 1600S has high-comp, modified R16TS engine running twin Webers 45 giving 138bhp and 132mph through five-speed ’box.
 January 1970: Four-speed base model: 1300cc V85, using RI2 1289cc,81 bhp motor. Five-speed 1300 and Super become 1300G and 1300S.
 October 1970: 1600 axed. Front indicators move from bumpers to wings on all cars. Group 4 1600S, with extra high-comp, 172bhp motor.
 March 1971: Spanish 1300, with all-disc brakes.
 October 1971: Range rationalised to 85 and 1600S models only.
 May 1973: New 1600S has 1605cc, 138bhp engine from A310. Five-speed ‘box standard.
 October 1973: Bodywork gains flush-fitting push-button door handles. 85 becomes 1300. 1600S given A310 four-stud alloy wheels, removable rear panel (added to 1300 in June "74), and rear suspension changed from swing axles to double wishbones. Two 1600 engines: SC with twin carbs and SI with Bosch fuel-injection. Group 4 rally 1600S replaced by 1800 (1798cc, 185bhp).
 October 1975: SX replaces 1600SC and SI, using 1647cc R16TX engine with single Weber carb. Chrome trim strips deleted.
 October 1976: 1600SX becomes only French A110, with ‘tape recorder’ alloys as used on Renault 5 Alpine.
 May 1977: Spanish 1300 replaced by 1400.
 July 1977: Production at Dieppe ceases after 7176 cars built.
 May 1978: Production ceases at FASA in Spain, where 1566 cars were made.

Engines
The A110 was fitted with a variety of engines between 1963 and 1977. Engines used on production cars included the following:

World Rally Championship victories

References

External links

A110
Group 4 (racing) cars
Sports cars
1970s cars
Cars introduced in 1963
Cars powered by rear-mounted 4-cylinder engines
Automobiles with backbone chassis
Rear-engined vehicles
World Rally championship-winning cars